Sansovini is an Italian surname. Notable people with the surname include:

Glauco Sansovini (1938–2019), Sammarinese politician
Marco Sansovini (born 1980), Italian footballer

See also
Sansovino (disambiguation)

Italian-language surnames

Sofia Sansovini 
Adele Sansovini